Mountain View Airport may refer to:

A military airport in Canada:
 Mountain View Airport (Ontario) in Mountain View, Ontario, Canada (TC: CPZ3)

Public-use airports in the United States:
 Mountain View Airport (Arkansas) in Mountain View, Arkansas, United States (FAA: 7M2)
 Mountain View Airport (Missouri) in Mountain View, Missouri, United States (FAA: MNF)